Ambri may refer to:

Ambrì, a village in Switzerland
"Ambri" (poem), a poem by Anwar Masood
 Ambri (company), formerly Liquid Metal Battery Corporation, a company developing liquid-metal batteries